Lt. Col. Mohamed Mahmoud Ould Louly (‎; 1 January 1943 – 16 March 2019) was the President of Mauritania and Chairman of the Military Committee for National Salvation (CSMN) from 3 June 1979 to 4 January 1980.

Early life 
Louly entered the army in November 1960, the year of independence and was trained in the French military academies. He then held various positions of responsibility in the government of Moktar Ould Daddah.

In 1978 he was one of the founding members of the Military Committee for National Recovery (CMRN), which under the leadership of Mustafa Ould Salek, July 10, 1978, President Moktar Ould Daddah crashed Miltärputsch due to the conflict in Western Sahara.

6 April 1979 and Louly Bouceif and Lieutenant Colonel Mohamed Khouna Ould Haidalla from the success of the Military Committee for National Salvation (CMSN). Louly to Saleks in the government held several ministerial posts, was June 3, 1979 to overcome Mustafa Ould Salek, the president's office, after his resignation due to his loss of power within the CMSN and economic problems arising from the conflict in the Western Sahara and the growing gap between Arab and black Africans in the country.

On 4 January 1980, his prime minister, Mohamed Khouna Ould Haidalla, dismissed him.

References

External links

1943 births
2019 deaths
Mauritanian military personnel
Leaders ousted by a coup
Heads of state of Mauritania
People from Tagant Region